Kjell Søbak (born 21 June 1957) is a Norwegian former biathlete. At the 1984 Olympics of Sarajevo, Søbak finished second with the Norwegian relay team, which consisted of himself, Eirik Kvalfoss, Rolf Storsveen, and Odd Lirhus. In addition, he finished fourth in the sprint competition at the same Olympics.

Biathlon results
All results are sourced from the International Biathlon Union.

Olympic Games
1 medal (1 silver)

World Championships
2 medals (1 silver, 1 bronze)

*During Olympic seasons competitions are only held for those events not included in the Olympic program.

Individual victories
2 victories (1 In, 1 Sp)

*Results are from UIPMB and IBU races which include the Biathlon World Cup, Biathlon World Championships and the Winter Olympic Games.

References

External links
 

1957 births
Living people
Sportspeople from Bodø
Norwegian male biathletes
Biathletes at the 1980 Winter Olympics
Biathletes at the 1984 Winter Olympics
Olympic biathletes of Norway
Medalists at the 1984 Winter Olympics
Olympic medalists in biathlon
Olympic silver medalists for Norway
Biathlon World Championships medalists